The 1899 Grand National was the 61st renewal of the Grand National horse race that took place at Aintree near Liverpool, England, on 24 March 1899.

Finishing Order

Non-finishers

References

 1899
Grand National
Grand National
19th century in Lancashire